The Turin Horse is a 2011 Hungarian drama film directed by Béla Tarr and Ágnes Hranitzky, starring János Derzsi, Erika Bók and Mihály Kormos. It was co-written by Tarr and his frequent collaborator László Krasznahorkai. It recalls the whipping of a horse in the Italian city of Turin that is rumoured to have caused the mental breakdown of philosopher Friedrich Nietzsche. The film is in black-and-white, shot in only 30 long takes by Tarr's regular cameraman Fred Kelemen, and depicts the repetitive daily lives of the horse-owner and his daughter.

The film was an international co-production led by the Hungarian company T. T. Filmműhely. Tarr announced then that it was to be his last film. After having been postponed several times, it premiered in 2011 at the 61st Berlin International Film Festival, where it received the Jury Grand Prix. The Hungarian release was postponed after the director had criticised the country's government in an interview.

The Turin Horse opened to general acclaim from film critics.

Plot 
The film begins with a narrator explaining German philosopher Friedrich Nietzsche's infamous mental breakdown in Turin, Italy in 1889 after seeing a man continually whip his horse, which yet refused to move. After uttering his final words,  ("mother, I am stupid"), Nietzsche became mute and demented, cared for by his family until his death a decade later.

The film focuses on a pair of impoverished potato farmers, father and daughter, and their horse (stated by the narrator, literally or metaphorically, to be the same one seen by Nietzsche) living in the 19th century Great Hungarian Plain where a violent wind blows unremittingly. They live out an arduous and repetitive existence defined by nihilistic despair; they often take turns sitting by the window alone. The horse is increasingly uncooperative, refusing to leave the property or eat and drink. A neighbour visits to trade some goods; he claims that the nearby town has been completely destroyed, and blames the apocalyptic scenario on both God and man. Later, a band of Romani arrives and drains the farmers' well of water. The father decides they must abandon the farm; the two pack and depart with the horse behaving uncharacteristically well, but return home and unpack shortly after leaving for unspecified reasons. They remove the horse's reins and shut it in the barn. The world then plunges into complete darkness; the two try to light lamps but find they quickly extinguish, even the coals. The next day, the winds can no longer be heard inside the house. Now subsisting on raw potatoes, the daughter refuses to eat or talk, seemingly resigning to her fate. The father appears to follow, not finishing his potato and sitting with his daughter in silence.

Cast 
 János Derzsi as stableman
 Erika Bók as daughter of the stableman
 Mihály Kormos as Bernhard the neighbor
 Mihály Ráday as narrator

Themes 
Director Béla Tarr says that the film is about the "heaviness of human existence". The focus is not on mortality, but rather the daily life: "We just wanted to see how difficult and terrible it is when every day you have to go to the well and bring the water, in summer, in winter... All the time. The daily repetition of the same routine makes it possible to show that something is wrong with their world. It's very simple and pure." Tarr has also described The Turin Horse as the last step in a development throughout his career: "In my first film I started from my social sensibility and I just wanted to change the world. Then I had to understand that problems are more complicated. Now I can just say it’s quite heavy and I don’t know what is coming, but I can see something that is very close – the end."

According to Tarr, the book the daughter receives is an "anti-Bible". The text was an original work by the film's writer, László Krasznahorkai, and contains references to Nietzsche. Tarr described the visitor in the film as "a sort of Nietzschean shadow". As Tarr elaborated, the man differs from Nietzsche in that he is not claiming that God is dead, but rather puts blame on both humans and God: "The key point is that the humanity, all of us, including me, are responsible for destruction of the world. But there is also a force above human at work – the gale blowing throughout the film – that is also destroying the world. So both humanity and a higher force are destroying the world."

Production 
The idea for the film had its origin in the mid 1980s, when Tarr heard Krasznahorkai retell the story of Nietzsche's breakdown, and ended it by asking what happened to the horse. Tarr and Krasznahorkai then wrote a short synopsis for such a story in 1990, but put it away in favour of making Sátántangó. Krasznahorkai eventually wrote The Turin Horse in prose text after the production of the duo's previous film, the troublesome The Man from London. The Turin Horse never had a conventional screenplay, and Krasznahorkai's prose was what the filmmakers used to find financial partners.

The Turin Horse was produced by Tarr's Hungarian company T. T. Filmműhely, in collaboration with Switzerland's Vega Film Production, Germany's Zero Fiction Film and France's MPM Film. It also had American involvement through the Minneapolis-based company Werc Werk Works. The project received 240,000 euro from Eurimages and 100,000 euro from Medienboard Berlin-Brandenburg.

Filming was located to a valley in Hungary. The house, well and stable were all built specifically for the film, and were not artificial sets but proper structures of stone and wood. The supposed 35-day shoot was set to take place during the months of November and December 2008. However because of adverse weather conditions, principal photography was not finished until 2010.

Release 
Tarr announced at the premiere of The Man from London that he was retiring from filmmaking and that his upcoming project would be his last. The Turin Horse was originally planned to be finished in April 2009 and ready to be screened at the 2009 Cannes Film Festival. After several delays, it was finally announced as a competition title at the 61st Berlin International Film Festival, where it premiered on 15 February 2011.

The Turin Horse was originally set to be released in Hungary on 10 March 2011 through the distributor Mokep. However, in an interview with the German newspaper Der Tagesspiegel on 20 February, Tarr accused the Hungarian government of obstructing artists and intellectuals, in what he referred to as a "culture war" led by the cabinet of Viktor Orbán. As a consequence to these comments, Mokep cancelled its release of the film. It eventually premiered in Hungary on 31 March 2011 instead. It was distributed in five prints through a collaboration between Cirko Film and Másképp Alapítvány.

Home media
The film was released on DVD and Blu-ray through The Cinema Guild on 17 July 2012.

Reception

Critical response
The Turin Horse received critical acclaim. At Metacritic, the film received an average score of 80/100, based on 15 reviews, which indicates "generally favorable reviews". The film holds an 89% "Certified Fresh" rating on the review aggregator Rotten Tomatoes based on 63 reviews, with an average rating of 8.10/10. The critical consensus states, "Uncompromisingly bold and hauntingly beautiful, Bela Tarr's bleak parable tells a simple story with weighty conviction."

Mark Jenkins of NPR described the film as "... an absolute vision, masterly and enveloping in a way that less personal, more conventional movies are not."  A. O. Scott of The New York Times lavished the film with praise, concluding, "The rigors of life can grind you down. The rigor of art can have the opposite effect, and The Turin Horse is an example — an exceedingly rare one in contemporary cinema — of how a work that seems built on the denial of pleasure can, through formal discipline, passionate integrity and terrifying seriousness, produce an experience of exaltation. The movie is too beautiful to be described as an ordeal, but it is sufficiently intense and unyielding that when it is over, you may feel, along with awe, a measure of relief. Which may sound like a reason to stay away, but is exactly the opposite."

Ray Bennett of The Hollywood Reporter wrote from the Berlinale: "Fans of Tarr’s somber and sedate films will know what they are in for and will no doubt find the time well spent. Others might soon grow weary of measured pace of the characters as they dress in their ragged clothes, eat boiled potatoes with their fingers, fetch water, clean their bowls, chop wood and feed the horse." Bennett complimented the cinematography, but added: "That does not, however, make up for the almost complete lack of information about the two characters, and so it is easy to become indifferent to their fate, whatever it is." Variety'''s Peter Debruge also noted how the narrative provided "little to cling to", but wrote: "Like Hiroshi Teshigahara's life-changingly profound The Woman in the Dunes ... by way of Bresson, Tarr's tale seems to depict the meaning of life in a microcosm, though its intentions are far more oblique. ... As the premise itself concerns the many stories not being told (Nietzsche is nowhere to be found, for instance), it's impossible to keep the mind from drifting to all the other narratives unfolding beyond the film's sparse horizon."

Accolades
The film won the Jury Grand Prix Silver Bear and the Competition FIPRESCI Prize at the Berlin Film Festival. It was selected as the Hungarian entry for the Best Foreign Language Film at the 84th Academy Awards, but it did not make the final shortlist. Tiny Mix Tapes named it the best film of 2012.

In BBC's 2016 poll of the greatest films since 2000, The Turin Horse ranked 63rd.

See also
 List of black-and-white films produced since 1970
 List of submissions to the 84th Academy Awards for Best Foreign Language Film
 List of Hungarian submissions for the Academy Award for Best Foreign Language Film

 References 

 External links 
 
 
 
 
 
 The Thinking Image: Fred Kelemen on Béla Tarr and The Turin Horse, an interview by Robert Koehler for Cinema Scope''

2011 films
2011 drama films
Hungarian drama films
Films set in the 19th century
Films shot in Hungary
Films about Friedrich Nietzsche
Films directed by Béla Tarr
Hungarian black-and-white films
2010s Hungarian-language films
Films with screenplays by László Krasznahorkai
Silver Bear Grand Jury Prize winners